Wonderful Rainbow is the third studio album by noise rock band Lightning Bolt. It is considered to be their most accessible album, featuring heavy but catchy bass guitar riffs and frenetic drums.

This album is listed in the book 1001 Albums You Must Hear Before You Die, which describes the band as creating "a mix of sheer abuse and welcome diversity, for a truly challenging listening experience".

Reception

Critical response to Wonderful Rainbow was generally favorable, with an average of 81 out of 100 based on 13 reviews on Metacritic. Online music magazine Pitchfork placed Wonderful Rainbow at number 157 on their list of top 200 albums of the 2000s.

Track listing

Personnel
Lightning Bolt
Brian Chippendale – drums and vocals
Brian Gibson – bass guitar
Technical personnel
Dave Auchenbach – recording engineer
Mike McHugh – recording engineer
Jeff Lipton – mastering
John Golden – vinyl mastering

References

External links
 Lightning Bolt official website
 Lightning Bolt at Load Records 

Lightning Bolt (band) albums
2003 albums
Load Records albums